Júlio César Leal Junior (born April 13, 1951 in Itajuba, Brazil) is an association football manager.

Leal has coached clubs in Kuwait, Brazil, Japan, United States and South Africa.

He parted ways with Orlando Pirates on 4 April 2012, three weeks after being suspended. 

Leal joined Polokwane City in November 2015, coached the club for one season which they finished in 13th place and parted ways with the club.

Managerial statistics

References

External links

1951 births
Living people
Brazilian football managers
Brazilian expatriate sportspeople in Kuwait
CR Vasco da Gama managers
United Arab Emirates national football team managers
Brazil national under-20 football team managers
Esporte Clube Bahia managers
Clube Atlético Bragantino managers
América Futebol Clube (SP) managers
Guarani FC managers
Fluminense FC managers
América Futebol Clube (RN) managers
Sport Club do Recife managers
Coritiba Foot Ball Club managers
Clube do Remo managers
Kazma SC managers
CR Flamengo managers
Tanzania national football team managers
J1 League managers
Yokohama FC managers
AmaZulu F.C. managers
Moroka Swallows F.C. managers
Orlando Pirates F.C. managers
Polokwane City F.C. managers
Kuwait Premier League managers
Brazilian expatriate sportspeople in Tanzania
Brazilian expatriate sportspeople in the United Arab Emirates
Brazilian expatriate sportspeople in Japan
Brazilian expatriate sportspeople in South Africa
Expatriate soccer managers in South Africa
Expatriate football managers in Kuwait
Expatriate football managers in the United Arab Emirates
Expatriate football managers in Tanzania
Expatriate football managers in Japan
Brazilian expatriate football managers